This is a list of peerages created for women in the peerages of England, Scotland, Ireland, Great Britain, or the United Kingdom.  It does not include peerages created for men which were later inherited by women, or life peerages created since 1958 under the Life Peerages Act 1958.

Background 
Prior to the regular creation of life peerages, the great majority of peerages were created for men. Suo jure peeresses are known from an early period; however, most of them were women to whom a peerage had passed as an inheritance.  It was very rare for a woman to be created a peeress before the 17th century. Peeresses of the first creation were not allowed to sit in the House of Lords until the passage of the Life Peerages Act 1958. Female holders of hereditary peerages could not sit in the Lords until the passage of the Peerage Act 1963. In some, but not all cases, peeresses of first creation were created for life only.

Created peeresses fall into the following categories:

 Created for merit or achievement
 Having a father who was a peer, but who under the terms of the peerage could not pass the peerage to his daughter. Such an event could create the anomalous situation of commoners holding important lands and estates traditionally associated with lordship.
 Closely connected to a reigning monarch (including many royal mistresses)
 Created to honour a relative, including:
 As a posthumous honour for a dead husband, often one who would have received a peerage if he had not died
 To honour a husband who was living, but could not or would not accept a peerage in his own right (for instance if he wanted to retain his seat in the elected Commons)
 To confer nobility upon the peeress's children, again often in recognition of the achievement of a husband

The peerages are listed chronologically, divided by the monarch who created them.

Richard II

Henry VIII

James I

Charles I

Charles II

James II

George I

George II

George III

George IV

William IV

Victoria

George V

George VI

See also
List of peerages inherited by women
 Audrey Hylton-Foster, Baroness Hylton-Foster, who was given a Life Peerage and an annuity in 1965 after her husband, Sir Harry Hylton-Foster, Speaker of the House of Commons, died while in office.
Pamela Sharples, Baroness Sharples, who was given a Life Peerage in 1973 after her husband, Sir Richard Sharples, Governor of Bermuda, was murdered.
Elizabeth Smith, Baroness Smith of Gilmorehill, who was given a Life Peerage in 1995 after her husband, the Labour leader John Smith, died of a heart attack.

Peeresses
Women

Peerages